Nikola Šaranović (born 20 August 2003) is a Serbian professional basketball player for FMP of the Basketball League of Serbia and the ABA League.

Early life 
Šaranović grew up with the Crvena zvezda youth system. In December 2020, he recorded a triple-double in a 101–60 win over the Smederevo 1953 Junior team making 21 points, 10 rebounds, 14 steals, and 7 assists.

Playing career 
In February 2021, head coach Dejan Radonjić added Šaranović to the Crvena zvezda mts roster for the 2021 Radivoj Korać Cup tournament in Novi Sad. Following a win over Mega Soccerbet in the Cup Finals, the Zvezda won its 10th National cup title while Šaranović won his first trophy. He never played a single game at the Cup tournament. On 19 February, Šaranović was a member of the Zvezda roster for a EuroLeague game with Zenit Saint Petersburg without any played time. 

On 25 August 2021, Šaranović officially signed a four-year professional contract with FMP.

National team career 
Šaranović was a member of the Serbian under-16 national team that participated at the 2019 FIBA U16 European Championship in Udine, Italy. Over seven tournament games, he averaged 7.1 points, three rebounds and 1.6 assists per game.

In July 2022, Šaranović was a member of the Serbian under-20 national team that won a gold medal at the 2022 FIBA U20 European Championship Division B in Tbilisi, Georgia. Over seven tournament games, he averaged 6.1 points, 2.1 rebounds, and 3.0 assists per game.

References

External links 
 Player Profile at eurobasket.com
 Player Profile at realgm.com
 Player Profile at euroleague.net
 Player Profile at aba-liga.com

2003 births
Living people
ABA League players
Basketball League of Serbia players
Basketball players from Belgrade
KK Crvena zvezda youth players
KK FMP players
Serbian men's basketball players
Small forwards